Anathbandhu Panja (29 October 1911 – 2 September 1933) was an Indian revolutionary and member of the Bengal Volunteers who carried out assassinations against British colonial officials in an attempt to secure Indian independence.

Family 
Panja was born in Jalabindu Village in Sabang (Paschim Medinipur in 1911. Surendra Nath Panja and Kumudini Devi were his parents. He lost his father at the age of three and lived with his mother and elder brother Surendranath.  He completed his early education from Bhuban Pal's Village Pathsala and then he went with his mother to Midnapore Town and got admitted in Sujaganj Primary School. But he could not continue his studies due to his economic problem. He joined Bengal Volunteers, a revolutionary organisation of British India and under the direction of the organisation he got admitted in Midnapur Town School and then Midnapur Collegiate School. At that time he was a member of ballavpur Jimnasiyam club

Revolutionary activities 

After the murder of Magistrate Paddy and Robert Douglas no British officer was ready to take the charge of Midnapore District. Mr. Bernard E J Burge, a ruthless District Magistrate was posted in Midnapore district. The members of the Bengal volunteers i.e. Naba Jiban Ghosh, Ramkrishna Roy, Brajakishore Chakraborty, Prabhanshu Sekhar Pal, Kamakhya Charan Ghosh, Sonatan Roy, Nanda Dulal Singh, Sukumar Sen Gupta, Bijoy Krishna Ghose, Purnananda Sanyal, Manindra Nath Choudhury, Saroj Ranjan Das Kanungo, Santi Gopal Sen, Sailesh Chandra Ghose, Anath Bondhu Panja and Mrigendra Dutta etc. decided to assassinate him. Panja along with Ramkrishna Roy, Brajakishore Chakraborty, Nirmal Jiban Ghosh and Mrigen Dutt planned to shot him dead while Burge was about to take part of a football match ( Bradley-Birt football tournament) named by Francis Bradley Bradley-Birt at the police grounds of Midnapore. Actually  the magistrate was a member of both Calcutta football Club and Calcutta cricket Club present time Calcutta Cricket and Football Club. Burge, during the half time of the football match in Police parade ground was killed when he was stepping from a car to take part of the football match on 2 September 1933 by them. Anathbandhu was killed instantly by the body guard of the DM and Mrigen Dutta died in the hospital on the next day. Anathbandhu Panja, Mrigen Dutta and the other persons were acquitted on murder charge of the district magistrate of Midnapore, Special Tribunal under B.C.L.A. Act, 1925 found that Bijoy Krishna Ghose, Purnanandu Sanyal, Manindra Nath Choudhury and Saroj Ranjan Das Kanungo were not guilty of the offence charged against them. The other persons namely Nirmal Jiban Ghosh, Brojokishore Chakravarty and Ram Krishna Roy found guilty and sentenced to death . The rest of the accused, namely Santi Gopal Sen, Kamakhya Charan Ghosh, Sonatan Roy, Nanda Dulal Singh, Sukumar Sen Gupta, Prabhanshu Sekhar Pal, Sailesh Chandra Ghose were found guilty and were sent to Jail.

Death 
Anathbandhu was killed instantly by the body guard of the District Magistrate on 2 September 1933.

Legacy 
A school near his village is named after him as Harirhat Anath Smriti Girls' High School. A statue of Panja was founded near Midnapore Collegiate School.

References 

1911 births
1933 deaths
Revolutionary movement for Indian independence
Indian nationalism
Indian people convicted of murder
Indian revolutionaries
Indian independence activists from Bengal
Revolutionaries from West Bengal
Revolutionaries of Bengal during British Rule
People from Paschim Medinipur district
Indian independence activists from West Bengal